Han Weiji, courtesy name Zhenzi, was a Chinese official who lived in the Qing dynasty. Han was born in Xiaotian Village, Zichuan County, Shandong Province, China (now Fujia Town, Zhangdian District, Zibo Prefecture). Han was a tong jinshi who obtained the third highest position in his class in the imperial examination. During the reign of the Kangxi Emperor, Han served as a county magistrate in Wenxi County, Shanxi and Boye County, Zhili.

Life 
Han Weiji was the grandson of Han Maocai and the son of Han Guangzhai. Han Weiji was a juren (lit. "presented scholar") in 1660, and ranked 146th in the imperial examination in 1664. He was appointed as the magistrate of Wenxi County, Shanxi in 1674, and then took office in Boye County, Zhili in 1681. He punished criminals severely in larceny cases, which led to a fall in crime rates in his jurisdictions.

References 

 Inline citation

 Books
 （中國國家圖書館藏）张鸣铎、张廷寀、王佳宾 纂修，《淄川縣志》，清乾隆四十一年（1776年）刻本。
 李遵唐 纂修，《聞喜縣志》，中國方志叢書，據乾隆三十年刊本影印，成文出版社印行。
 （中國國家圖書館藏）吴鏊、尹启铨 纂修，《博野縣志》，清乾隆三十二年（1767年）刻本。
 《淄博历史人物》，新世界出版社。

External links 
 清康熙进士——韩维基 张店区人民政府

Qing dynasty people
People from Zibo